Bādghīs is one of the thirty-four provinces of Afghanistan, located in the northwest of the country, on the border with Turkmenistan. It is considered to be one of the country's most underdeveloped provinces, with the highest poverty rate. The capital is Qala e Naw, while the most populous city and the district are Bala Murghab. The ruins of the medieval city of Marw al-Rudh, the historical capital of the medieval region of Gharjistan, are located in the province near the modern city of Bala Murghab.

Geography
Badghis Province is located in the isolated hills of northwestern Afghanistan and shares its borders with Herat, Ghor, and Faryab provinces as well as Turkmenistan. The province has a total area of 20,591 km2. Hydrologically, the province is dominated by the Murghab River which is used for irrigation. It contains some mountains but is predominantly characterized by rolling hills divided by ravines.

The province is very windy; the name "Badghis" is a corruption of the Persian compound "bâd-khiz", meaning "wind source", referring to the steppe winds that blow into the province from the north and northwest.  Its northern border extends to the edge of the part of the Karakum desert known as the Sarakhs desert. Northern Badghis includes the loess and other aeolian formations, known locally as the "chul", through which the Turkmen-Afghan boundary runs. Across the border in Turkmenistan is the Badhyz State Nature Reserve in the Badkhiz-Karabil semi-desert.

History
Before the Arab conquest, the province was the center of the Kingdom of Badghis, whose king Tarkhan Tirek resisted an Umayyad invasion in 709 AD.  After the Arab conquest, the province was rebellious and it served as a haven for religious dissenters until about 1000 AD. Badghis' excellent grasslands were used as summer pastures by the Timurid dynasty in the fifteenth century.  By the late 19th century, the province was devastated by Turkmen raids. In 1964, the province was carved out of portions of Herat Province and Meymaneh Province.

The province was one of the last captured by the Taliban in their military offensive before the American invasion in 2001. The province was quickly retaken by Northern Alliance forces as the United States initiated hostilities. Badghis Province came under complete control of the Taliban in 2021.

In January 2022, the province was struck by a 5.3 earthquake, killing dozens.

Demographics
Like in the rest of Afghanistan, no exact population numbers are available. The Afghan Ministry of Rural Rehabilitation & Development (MRRD) along with UNHCR and the National Statistics and Information Authority (NSIA) of Afghanistan estimates the population of the province to be around 559,297 in 2021. Badghis male population in 2013 was 241,200-while the female population accounts for 230,700- the single year for which the data is available at the moment. Tajiks are  making around 67% of the province's population. The other is made up of mostly Pashtuns (10%) and smaller Hazara, Uzbek, Turkmen, and Baluch.

Politics

The major political parties are:
 Jamiat-e Islami (Islamic Society of Afghanistan)
 Hezb-e Islami Gulbuddin
 Islamic Council of Herat

At the province was a Provincial Reconstruction Team, which was led by Spain. In January 2019 a US service member from Texas, serving with the 75th Ranger Regiment, was fatally wounded during a combat operation in the province.

Economy
Badghis is counted as one of the most underdeveloped of the country's thirty-four provinces.  Not only does it have the little infrastructure, and poor roads, it has a chronic shortage of water. Agriculture is the main source of people's income and the existence of the Murghab River makes the available land suitable for cultivation. The province has suffered from severe drought beginning in the late 1990s and continuing. It has caused tens of thousands of residents to flee to refugee camps outside Herat. The drought has been exacerbated by the excessive cutting of forests since 2001. Badghis is the leading province in Afghanistan in pistachio production. It is also one of the carpet-making areas of the country. The province produced Karakul sheep until the late 1970s.

Transportation
Badghis Province suffers from a lack of adequate transportation. A single airport exists at the provincial seat--Qala i Naw Airport (QAQN), which is capable of handling light aircraft. Work on a 233 km section of the Afghan ring road started up again in 2012. This section would connect Bala Murghab with Herat in the southwest, and Maymana and Mazar-i Sharif in the northeast.

Healthcare
The percentage of households with clean drinking water fell from 11.6% in 2005 to 1% in 2011. The percentage of births attended to by a skilled birth attendant increased from 15% in 2005 to 17% in 2011. Official government figures for 2007 indicated that 17% of the Badghis population had access to safe drinking water, while only 1% of births were attended by a skilled person.

Education
According to information from the education department, there are 457 schools with 75 high and the rests are primary and secondary schools. There are as many as 120,000 students, with 35% of them being female students. There is one vocational high school of agriculture and one midwife training Institute in the province as well. However, as of 2007, the overall literacy rate was only 9.5%.

Districts

Badghis province is divided into seven districts.
 Ab Kamari
 Ghormach District
 Jawand District
 Muqur District
 Bala Murghab District
 Qadis District
 Qala i Naw District
 Murghab District

See also
 Provinces of Afghanistan

Notes and references

External links

 Map of Badghis Province (PDF)
 Badghis Province Overview - Slides (University of Montana)
 Afghanistan Information Management Service

 
Provinces of Afghanistan
States and territories established in 1964
Provinces of the Islamic Republic of Afghanistan